Arthur Freedlander (August 2, 1876 – June 24, 1940) was an American painter. His work was part of the painting event in the art competition at the 1932 Summer Olympics.

References

1876 births
1940 deaths
20th-century American painters
American male painters
Olympic competitors in art competitions
People from New York City
20th-century American male artists